Anderson Private School for the Gifted, Talented and Creative is a private school in Fort Worth, Texas. The school accepts students ages 4–16 and does not use grade levels. Students by 16 are typically dual enrolled in Anderson and a local college. Typically the total student body is 20–25.

History
Dr. William and LeVonna Anderson, the cofounders of the school, began planning for it in 1983, and the school first opened in 1995.

Notable alumni
 Ethan Couch - did not graduate,  killed four people while driving under the influence of alcohol and drugs, commonly known as "affluenza" teen.

References

External links
 Anderson Private School

Private high schools in Texas
Private middle schools in Texas
Private elementary schools in Texas
Private high schools in Fort Worth, Texas
1995 establishments in Texas
Educational institutions established in 1995
Schools in Parker County, Texas